This is a list of the seasons played by OFK Titograd from 1950, when the club is founded. The club's achievements in all major national competitions are listed.

Seasons in domestic competitions

Championship

Final placement by seasons
From 1950, FK Mladost played seasons in domestic leagues of SFR Yugoslavia, FR Yugoslavia, Serbia and Montenegro and Montenegro. Below is a list of FK Mladost final placements by every single season.
During the period 1960–1992, FK Mladost played in official competitions under the name OFK Titograd, which was again adopted in 2018.

See also
FK Mladost Podgorica
Montenegrin First League
Montenegrin clubs in Yugoslav football competitions (1946–2006)

Seasons
Lists of Montenegrin football club seasons